Budget Act or budget act may refer to various budget acts and budgetary policies:

By location

Australia 

 Various Australian federal budget acts

Canada 

 Various Canadian federal budget acts

France 

 Various French budget acts

Germany 

 Various German federal budget acts

India 

 Various Indian union budget acts
 Fiscal Responsibility and Budget Management Act, 2003

Norway 

 Various Norwegian state budget acts

Russia 

 Various Russian federal budget acts

Scotland 

 Various Scottish budget acts

Switzerland 

 Various Swiss federal budget acts

United Kingdom 

 Various United Kingdom budget acts
 Budget Responsibility and National Audit Act 2011

United States 

 Various United States federal budget acts
 Budget and Accounting Act
 Consolidated Omnibus Budget Reconciliation Act of 1985
 Gramm–Rudman–Hollings Balanced Budget Act
 Omnibus Budget Reconciliation Act of 1987
 Budget Enforcement Act of 1990
 Omnibus Budget Reconciliation Act of 1990
 Omnibus Budget Reconciliation Act of 1993
 Balanced Budget Act of 1997
 Budget Control Act of 2011
 Medicare, Medicaid, and SCHIP Balanced Budget Refinement Act of 1999
 No Budget, No Pay Act

See also 

 Balanced budget
 Standard budget
 Personal budget
 Operating budget
 Unified budget
 Budget process